The Viva la Vida Tour was the fourth concert tour undertaken by British rock band Coldplay. It was launched in support their fourth studio album, Viva la Vida or Death and All His Friends (2008), becoming a massive commercial and critical success. The tour visited Europe, Asia, Oceania and the Americas, further establishing the band as one of the biggest touring acts in the world. 

The stage setup consisted of a stripped-down main stage and two catwalks; Coldplay also performed amongst audience members at the back of venues in a special acoustic set.  Instead of a giant video screen on-stage, the band opted for six hanging giant PufferSpheres that displayed images, video and streamed closeups.  Lead singer Chris Martin dubbed the fixtures as their "magic balls". During the intro, The Blue Danube by Johann Strauss II was played on all concerts right before the band came into the stage. The tour visited arenas and stadiums in separate phases: In London, they visited The O2 Arena in 2008 and the Wembley Stadium in 2009, with the latter show featuring a half-dome stage design.

Coldplay were accompanied by Oxfam and David Gibbin during the tour.  Volunteers were stationed at each venue to tell concert goers how to reduce poverty; the organization's logo and website was featured on one of the light ball fixtures during each show. On 23 July 2008 Coldplay performed their second in two shows at the United Center arena in Chicago. In each of the two shows, the band shot the music video for "Lost!" by performing the song twice.
On 19 September 2008, Chris Martin was accompanied by A-ha pianist Magne Furuholmen in the encore at the Oslo Spektrum, Oslo, to play a cover of the A-Ha song "Hunting High and Low".

Visuals

The intro of the concert would begin in space before turning to show the Earth and zooming to aerial views of the continent, country, city and then stadium that the show would take place. The idea was to make each show being a spectacle in its own, rather than just part of the tour. The cosmic theme is repeated across a number of the visuals like "Speed of Sound" and "Glass of Water". This takes the gig-goers on a journey through a solar system where the stars coalesce to form an eye shape that goes supernova and engulfs the screen in flames. However, other sections of the show were completely different. "Lovers in Japan", one of the highlights in visual terms, uses a series of archive footage and animations across the screen at the back of the stage and in the end thousands of confetti butterflies would rain all over the venue. For the show's closing number, "Life in Technicolor II", the paintings created for the album artwork from Viva La Vida was treated with sprocket and projection effects to create a vibrant, immersive and colorful effect.

Opening acts
There were 34 supporting acts for the tour. They are:

The Blue Jackets (New York City)
Jon Hopkins (North America—Leg 1, select dates)
Shearwater (North America—Leg 1, select dates)
Santigold (North America—Leg 1, select dates) (Japan—February 2009)
Sleepercar (North America—Leg 1, select dates)
Duffy (North America—Leg 2, select dates)
Snow Patrol (North America—Leg 3, select dates)
Howling Bells (North America—Leg 3, select dates) (Europe—Leg 3, select dates)
Pete Yorn (North America—Leg 3, select dates)
Amadou and Mariam (North America—Leg 4, select dates)
Kitty Daisy & Lewis (North America—Leg 4, select dates)
Elbow (North America—Leg 4, select dates) (Ireland—September 2009)
Albert Hammond Jr (Europe—Leg 1)
The High Wire (Europe—Leg 2, select dates)
Eugene Francis Jnr and the Juniors and the Juniors (England—December 2008)
The Domino State (London—14 December 2008)
Kilians (Europe—Leg 3, select dates)

Bat For Lashes (Europe—Leg 3, select dates) (South America)
The Flaming Lips (Europe—Leg 3, select dates)
White Lies (Europe—Leg 3, select dates)
Moi Caprice (Denmark—August 2009)
Datarock (Norway—August 2009)
Ministri (Italy—August 2009)
Pegasus (Switzerland—September 2009)
The Sunday Drivers (Spain—September 2009)
Miss Montreal (Netherlands—September 2009)
Girls Aloud (Britain (Scotland and England)—September 2009)
Jay-Z (Britain (Scotland and England)—September 2009)
La Roux (England—December 2009)
Decoder Ring (Australia)
Hollie Smith (New Zealand) 
Mercury Rev (Australia) (New Zealand) (Asia—March 2009)
The Ting Tings (Japan—February 2009)
Vanguart (Brazil)

Commercial performance
According to Pollstar, the tour has grossed $209.4 million from 2,831,377 tickets sold in 166 reported dates. They also broke the attendance record of Sydney's Acer Arena, which was previously held by Justin Timberlake's FutureSex/LoveShow.

Set list

{{hidden
| headercss = background: #ccccff; font-size: 100%; width: 65%;
| contentcss = text-align: left; font-size: 100%; width: 75%;
| header = Wembley Stadium, 18–19 September 2009
| content =
"Life in Technicolor"
"Violet Hill"
"Clocks"
"In My Place"
"Glass of Water"
"Yellow"
"Cemeteries of London"
"42"
"Fix You"
"Strawberry Swing"
"God Put a Smile Upon Your Face"
"Talk"
"The Hardest Part" (acoustic)
"Postcards from Far Away"
"Viva la Vida"
"Lost+" (with Jay-Z.)
"Rhyming Song" (acoustic)
"Death Will Never Conquer"
"Trouble"
"Billie Jean" (acoustic) (Michael Jackson cover)
Encore
"Politik"
"Lovers in Japan"
"Death and All His Friends"
Encore 2
"The Scientist"
"Life in Technicolor ii"
}}

Tour dates

Cancelled shows

Personnel
Credits taken from the band's official tour book, which was sold exclusively on merchandise booths and their online store.

Performing members
 Chris Martin – lead vocals, piano, rhythm guitar
 Jonny Buckland – lead guitar, backing vocals, keyboards
 Guy Berryman – bass, backing vocals, keyboards, percussion
 Will Champion – drums, backing vocals, percussion

Main crew
 Dave Holmes – manager
 Andy Franks – tour manager
 Phil Harvey – creative director
 Vicki Taylor – artist assistant and instrument painting
 Emma Jane McDonald – artist assistant
 Paul Normandale – production designer
 Craig Finley – production manager
 Dan Green – FoH sound
 Fraser Elisha – lighting director
 Chris Wood – monitor engineer
 Yasmine Kotb – tour accountant
 Kurt Wagner – stage manager
 Marguerite Nguyen – production assistant
 Craig Hope – backline technician
 Matt McGinn – guitar technician
 Sean Buttery – drum technician
 Neil Lambert – backline technician
 Matt Miller – MIDI technician and videographer
 Tony Smith – FoH assistant
 Nick Davis – monitor technician
 Stephanie Thompson – RF technician

Video
 Andy Bramley – video director and content
 Ed Jarman – video engineer and crew chief
 Ben Miles – catalyst and content
 Mathew Vassalo – projectionist

Video crew
 Jason Lowe 
 Phil Johnson

Lighting crew
 Dave Favourita (chief)
 Tommy Green
 Wayne Kwiat
 Niall Ogilvy
 David Cox (UK)
 Dave Jolly (UK)
 Marta Iwan (US)
 Jim Michaelis (US)

Sound technicians
 Rob Collett (UK)
 Owen McAuley (UK)
 Simon Rogers (UK)
 Jim Allen (US)
 Stephan Curtain (US)
 Carlos Sallaberry (US)

Stage
 Rick Stucker – head carpenter
 Russell Macias – carpenter
 Gabriel Wood – head rigger
 Charles Anderson – rigger
 Brooke Blomquist – confetti
 Mike Hartle – laser
 Tiffany Henry – dressing rooms and wardrobe

Security
 Jackie Jackson – venue security
 Kelly Samuels – band security
 Geoff Sands – band security

Merchandise
 Signatures Network, Inc. – Dell Furano, Rick Fish, Pete Weber
 De-Lux – Jeremy Joseph
 Eric Wagner – product development and road manager
 Joe Heden – US Road Merchandise Mrg.
 Jon Ellis – UK Road Merchandise Mgr.

Catering
 Heidi Varah – chief
 Darren Shead – head chef
 Pauline Austin – chef
 Sarah Money – FoH
 Jessie Collins – FoH

Management
 Mandi Bursteen, Ivan Entchevitch – Dave Holmes assistant
 Lauren Valencia, Arlene Moon – 3D Management

Booking agents
 Marty Diamond, Larry Webman – Paradigm (US)
 Steve Strange, Josh Javor, Nicki Forestiero – X-Ray Touring (international)

Business management
 Lester Dales, Maul Makin – Dales Evans
 Donna McQueen, Tracy Lawson – assistant
 David Weise – David Weise and Associates (US)

Legal representative
 Gavin Maude – Russells

Suppliers
 Chapman Freeborne – aircraft charter
 Matt Snowball Music – anything at any time
 Stars and Cars – Europe artist transport
 Moorcrofts – UK artist transport
 DPL – US artist transport
 Beat the Street – UK buses
 Celebrity Coaches – US buses
 Global Motion – freight forwarder
 Robertson Taylor Insurance Brokers – insurance brokers
 Lite Alt – UK lighting
 Upstaging – US lighting
 All Access – passes
 Strictly FX – confetti and lasers
 Wigwam – UK sound
 Eighth Day – US sound
 John Henry's – storage
 Celebrity Protection – tour security
 Music by Appointment – UK travel
 Altour – US travel
 Stagetruck – UK trucks
 Upstaging – US trucks
 XL Video – video

77 Million Paintings
 Brian Eno – paintings and music

Website
 Wendy Marvel, Brian Schulmeister – design
 Chris Salmon – editor
 Debs Wild – ambassador

Creative input
 Brian Eno
 Markus Dravs
 Tim Crompton
 Lee Lodge

Tour book
 Wendy Marvel, Eric Wagner – design
 Matthew Miller – front cover design
 William Garland – lithography

Photos courtesy of
 Guy Berryman
 Stephan Crasneanscki
 James Gooding
 Dan Green
 Penny Howle
 Matthew Miller
 Greg Waterman

Others
 Pete Lusby – Oxfam UK representative
 Soha Yassine – Oxfam US representative
 Dan Portanier – trainer
 Rik Simpson – additional musical production
 Andy Rugg – additional engineering
 Beth Fenton – stage uniforms designer

Special thanks
 Alison Burton
 Air Studios
 All bus and truck drivers

Gear
Credits taken from Projection, Lights & Staging News, with product quantities being represented between parenthesis whenever possible.

 Flying Pig Systems Wholehog 3
 Wing, Catalyst and Green Hippo Hippotizer Media Servers
 Martin MAC 2000 Wash XBs (17)
 Martin MAC 2000 Wash Fixtures (7)
 Martin MAC 700 Spots (32)
 Martin MAC 250 Wash Fixtures (20)
 Martin Atomic 3000 Strobes (27)
 Nova Flowers (4)
 i-Pix BB4s (12)
 Omni Wash Lights (10)
 Mole Richardson 4-Lite Blinders (28)
 Mole Richardson 2K Mole Beams (8)
 Custom Clip Light Fixtures (4)
 Reel EFX DF 50s (4)
 Look Solutions Unique Haze Machines (4)

See also
 List of Coldplay live performances
 List of highest-grossing concert tours
 List of highest-grossing live music artists

Notes

References

External links

Coldplay Official Website

2008 concert tours
2009 concert tours
2010 concert tours
Coldplay concert tours
Concert tours of Asia
Concert tours of Australia
Concert tours of Austria
Concert tours of Belgium
Concert tours of Canada
Concert tours of Denmark
Concert tours of Europe
Concert tours of France
Concert tours of Germany
Concert tours of Hong Kong
Concert tours of Italy
Concert tours of Ireland
Concert tours of Japan
Concert tours of Mexico
Concert tours of New Zealand
Concert tours of Norway
Concert tours of North America
Concert tours of Oceania
Concert tours of Singapore
Concert tours of South America
Concert tours of Spain
Concert tours of Sweden
Concert tours of Switzerland
Concert tours of the Netherlands
Concert tours of the United Kingdom
Concert tours of the United States